The Progressive Party of Manitoba, Canada, was a political party that developed from the United Farmers of Manitoba (UFM), an agrarian movement that became politically active following World War I.

See also
List of political parties in Canada
Progressive Party of Canada

References

1920 establishments in Manitoba
1932 disestablishments in Manitoba
Agrarian parties in Canada
Defunct agrarian political parties
Defunct political parties in Canada
Political parties disestablished in 1932
Political parties established in 1920
Provincial political parties in Manitoba
Progressivism in Canada
United Farmers